Wegscheider is a surname. Notable people with the surname include:

 Julius Wegscheider (1771–1849), German theologian
 Kurt-Curry Wegscheider (born 2001), Central African basketball player
 Rudolf Wegscheider (1859–1935), Austrian chemist
 Kristian Wegscheider (born 1954), german organ builder

German-language surnames